Lavinia Gianoni (31 August 1911 – 20 December 2005) was an Italian gymnast who competed in the 1928 Summer Olympics. In 1928 she won the silver medal as member of the Italian gymnastics team.

1928 was the first women's Olympic gymnastics event where five teams competed. Lavinia Gianoni was the oldest member of the Italian gymnastics team in 1928 at 17 years of age.

References

External links
 
 
 

1911 births
2005 deaths
Italian female artistic gymnasts
Olympic gymnasts of Italy
Gymnasts at the 1928 Summer Olympics
Olympic silver medalists for Italy
Olympic medalists in gymnastics
Medalists at the 1928 Summer Olympics